

New Cadet Competition Format (2015–present) 
The current Civil Air Patrol National Cadet Competition (NCC) program (2015–Present) has been redesigned into a new format combining both drill team and color guard aspects into one competition. Core Events include: Inspection, Written Exam, Physical Fitness, Team Leadership Problem(s), Standard Color Guard Drill, Standard Element Drill, Indoor Posting of the Colors, and Outdoor Posting of the Colors.

The new curriculum's mission statement states: "The CAP National Cadet Competition program showcases the full range of challenges in cadet life experienced at the squadron level, and new areas of learning that are important to America." As a result, the competition has added several new elective competitive components to reflect the CAP Cadet Program, such as: rocketry, public speaking (extemporaneous, impromptu), geocaching, robotics, community service project, Jeopardy, Panel Quiz, Unmanned aerial vehicle (UAS), and Obstacle courses. Elective Components differ from year to year and are chosen at the discretion of the Activity Director.

Qualification 
All 52 wings and 8 regions host a Cadet Competition each year in order to decide which team will ultimately represent their wings and regions respectively. Specifically, the winning team and runner up for each wing represent their respective wing at the region competition. At the region competition the winner and runner up receive a slot to represent their region at National Cadet Competition. NCC continues to be the most prestigious and elite competition Civil Air Patrol has to offer.

Team composition and eligibility

Eligibility 
The NCC program is open to all cadet and composite squadrons. There are no special age or cadet grade requirements.

Team composition 
Teams consist of six cadets, with one cadet serving as Team Commander. There are no alternates. The cadet must also have two escorts, with one eligible to drive a CAP vehicle.

Multi-squadron teams: Teams may draw cadets from a maximum of two squadrons.

Competitive events (2015–present) 
CAPP 60–75 - To fulfill its mission and vision, the NCC program consists of six core performance events for teams and numerous elective events for individuals and small groups. The elective events are randomized each year by the NCC Director for variety, resource, and availability purposes.

Awards

Trophy 
The USAF Chief of Staff Outstanding Cadet Team Championship Trophy is presented to the most outstanding overall team, based on performance in both the core and the elective events. The Air Force Chief of Staff, General David C. Jones, USAF approved of this award and authorized it in the name of all Air Force Chiefs of Staff on 26 April 1978. Hence, the trophy has been nicknamed "Jonesy." The trophy displays every winning team named by region since its creation.

The trophy is at display at National Headquarters Civil Air Patrol, in Maxwell Air Force Base.

NCC Ribbon
Until further notice, participation at NCC garners the "green" National Color Guard Competition Ribbon, IAW CAPR 39-3, § 20-c.

The National Color Guard Competition Ribbon is awarded for participation in the National Color Guard Competition. Senior members who earned this ribbon as a cadet may continue to wear the ribbon.

 The basic ribbon will be worn by cadets who are the winner of the wing competition and/or cadets selected to represent the wing at a region competition.
 A bronze star will be affixed for the winners of the region competition, and a silver star will be worn by the sweepstakes winner of the national competition. Repetitive awards may be recognized by wearing additional stars in the appropriate competition level. 
 The ribbon may also be awarded to a maximum of three senior members per team, who were responsible for escorting, chaperoning and training their respective teams at the wing, region and national level competitions.

Rarity of Star Device(s) 

 96 Cadets will earn the Bronze Star Device (Region Champions) on the NCC Ribbon Annually. 
 Only 6 cadets earn the Silver Star (National Champions) Device on the NCC Ribbon Annually. Statistically, less than .0003% in the entire CAP Cadet Corps. Making it one of the rarest and most prestigious devices in the Civil Air Patrol.

NCSA Ribbon 
Cadet and Senior Members who serve as Logistical Staff, and Judges for the entirety of the NCC Activity earn the National Cadet Special Activity Ribbon.

Pamphlet 
The National Cadet Competition will utilize CAPP 60–75.

Winners (2015–present)

(NCC) National Cadet Competition facts, records, and statistics (1974–present) 

 To date, the 2002 Florida Wing Color Guard was the only team to win first place in every event at NCC.
 Puerto Rico Wing from the Southeast Region is wing with the most participations and qualifications to NCC in its history since 1974.
 Only five wings in history have been home to BOTH a NDTC and a NCGC Champion Team; Puerto Rico, Arizona, California, New York and Utah.
 Dr. Cesareo Rosa Nieves Cadet Squadron, from the Puerto Rico Wing, in the Southeast Region (SER-PR-123) is the only one squadron has been home to both a National Champion Drill Team and National Champion Color Guard. (Drill team in 2004, 2007, and 2011. Color Guard in 2012.). This Squadron also has the most participations on record for both NCGC and NDTC. 
 Only one cadet has commanded more than one team to a National Drill Team Championship.  That was C/Col Jose Figueroa, from NER-NJWG, in 1992, 1993, and 1994.
 Only one cadet has commanded more than one team to a National Cadet Competition Championship. That was C/Col Cassie Ramer from FLWG in 2018 and 2019.
 Most successful coach/escort is Capt Cesar Alayon of FLWG with three consecutive NCC Championships (2018, 2019, 2022) as a coach/escort. 
 Only one team has won three consecutive National Drill Team Championships.  That team was NER-NJWG in 1992, 1993, and 1994. 
 Only one team has won three consecutive National Cadet Competition Championships. That team was Knights of SER-FL-458 in 2018, 2019, 2022.  Due to the Competition Being postponed as a result of restrictions of the Covid-19 Pandemic, the 2022 championship is considered a consecutive win.
Under the new combined 2015 format, Southeast Region remains undefeated with 5 consecutive wins as a Region.

Former National Cadet Competition Drill Team (NDTC) & Color Guard (NCGC) format 
The Civil Air Patrol National Cadet Competition (CAPP 52–4 2009 curriculum) was the highest echelon of competition for Civil Air Patrol (CAP) Drill Teams and Color Guards, including all 52 Wings and 8 regions of the CAP. Annually, each of the 52 CAP wings hosted a competition to decide one drill team and one color guard winner to represent their wing to their respective regional competition. Wing Competitions were normally held anywhere from December to March and region competitions were usually held anywhere from April to May, with the winning drill team and color guard representing their respective region at the National Cadet Competition held every summer. Only one drill team and one color guard was able to represent their region at the NCC, making NCC the most elite competition CAP had to offer. The winning NCC teams were awarded the United States Air Force Chief of Staff Sweepstakes Award Trophy, with their wing name being added to the trophy's display. To add to its prestige, each NCC winner was awarded a silver star which was added to their drill team or color guard ribbon. The final National Cadet Competition, the 2013 National Cadet Competition (NCC), was held July 17 through July 20 in Dayton, Ohio at Wright State University and Stebbins High School. Since 2013, the NCC has been canceled and changed to reflect the new direction of the CAP Cadet Program. For more information on the new NCC program, please visit: https://www.capmembers.com/cadet_programs/activities/national_cadet_competition/

2013 National Drill Team Competition winners:
 Southeast Region - Tennessee Wing

2013 National Color Guard Competition winners:
 Rocky Mountain Region - Utah Wing

Photos and full results from the 2013 NCC can be found here:

2013 NCC results

The wings who represented their regions to the 2013 National Cadet Competition were as follows:

2013 Schedule and Directions

The results from the 2012 NCC can be found here:
http://www.kalemis.com/ncc/index.html

All previous year's winners can be found here:
https://web.archive.org/web/20121201032344/http://www.ncsas.com/ncc_winners/

International Drill Competition

In 1947, based upon the cadet training program which required proficiency in standard drill "without arms," General Lucas V. Beau, Civil Air Patrol's National Commander, instituted the National Drill Competition. Rules were drafted by the US Drill Competition Committee, United States Air Force Ceremonial Detachment located at Bolling AFB, Washington DC and practices used by the Army ROTC program.

Major General Lucas Victor Beau, Commanding General of the Civil Air Patrol, was a well-known figure with countries having aviation cadet programs or showing an interest in establishing one. General Beau was well liked and had a longtime association with the Air Cadet League of Canada, an organization started in 1939 and one that the CAP Cadet program was modeled after when it began in October 1942.

Beau was attending a planning meeting in April 1947 in Canada to help organize the first International Air Cadet Exchange program which was to start in the summer of 1948 between the United States and Canada. When it was mentioned that CAP was establishing a National Drill Competition along the lines of the annual drill competition and exhibition that was held in Canada for the Air League. A point was made that the CAP Cadets were excellent marchers, and the Canadians counted that they too were suburb drill men; thus, a challenge.

Beau donated in 1948 for presentation at the first meet held in conjunction with the New York City Jubilee at Idlewild Airport Jamaica, Long Island, a heavy Sterling Silver trophy which is shaped in the form of the circular CAP Shoulder patch, it is 12 inches in diameter and 1 inch thick, the top of the circle is an arc with engraved relief block letters that spell out the words "CIVIL AIR PATROL". The trophy center piece is a highly polished raised isosceles triangle set on a circular blue background with raised -inch border; within its center is a raised red three-bladed propeller, and the raised block letters "US" is centered on the lower half of the blue. "1949 CANADA".

Winners of the IDC

Winners of the National Competition

The National Drill Competition was governed by its original rules from 1948 to 1965. Between 1948 and 1959, the winners of the competition were awarded the Colonel George A. Stone CAP Trophy. From 1960, until the final National Drill Competition under the original rules was held in 1965, the trophy was given no name.

The winners of the National Drill Competition under its original rules are listed below.

From 1966 to 1973, no National Drill Competition was held. The efforts of the National Commander's Committee on Cadet Programs (1971 to 1975) was instrumental in reestablishing and developing the National Cadet Competition, which besides drill and inspection added physical fitness, and knowledge of aerospace education to it curriculum. Originally it was to be called the National Cadet Olympics and later renamed in 1975 to the National Cadet Competition. The first was held in Dallas, Texas in 1974.

From 1974 to 1977, the winners of the competition were presented a trophy given under no name.  In 1978 the CAP-USAF Commander, Brigadier General Paul E. Gardner, USAF, in a memorandum recommended the use of Civil Air Patrol Corporate funds in the amount of $1,000 to rename and establish the USAF Chief of Staff Sweepstakes Award Trophy as recognition of the national champions. The National Executive Committee of CAP approved on 4 March 1978.

The Air Force Chief of Staff at the time, General David C. Jones, USAF, approved of this award and authorized it in the name of all Air Force Chiefs of Staff on 26 April 1978.

In 1996, the National Cadet Competition was split into two distinct competitions; the National Drill Team Competition, and the National Color Guard Competition.

The winners of the National Drill Team Competition are listed below.

The winners of the National Color Guard Competition are listed below.

Statistics of the National Cadet Competition (1974–2013)
The following table shows the number of national championships won since the recreation of the National Cadet Competition in 1974 until the discontinuation of NCC in 2013, by region.

References

External links
Official National Cadet Competition website
Official National Cadet Competition Manual
 Civil Air Patrol Volunteer Now, July 25 2013 article

Civil Air Patrol Cadet Programs
National Cadet Special Activities of the Civil Air Patrol